The Teatro Metastasio is a theatre located in Prato, Italy. Designed by architect Luigi De Cambray Digny, construction of the theatre began in March 1829. The inaugural performance of theatre was of Gioachino Rossini's Aureliano in Palmira on 8 October 1830. It remains the city of Prato's main venue for operas, plays, and concerts.

External links
Official Website of Teatro Metastasio

Metastasio
Theatres completed in 1830
Prato
Buildings and structures in Prato
Tourist attractions in Tuscany
Music venues completed in 1830
1830 establishments in the Grand Duchy of Tuscany
1830 establishments in Italy
19th-century architecture in Italy